The 1981 Star World Championships were held in Marblehead, United States in 1981. It was the first time since Pim von Huetschler in the 40th  that non American sailors won the prestigious Worlds Title. It were Alexander Hagen and Vincent Hoesch from Germany that rocked the Star Class in the early 80th with Laser like downwind technics and light body weight. They were struggling upwind because of minor crew weight. They managed to reach the 1st mark in 10th position but were "flying" on the reach to call for room at the jibing mark into 1st position. They were rocking the boat and pumping sails like sitting on a Laser to extend their lead. Then it was easy to defend the lead from the front despite their poor upwind speed. 2 Years later rocking and pumping was forbidden by the IYRU-Racing Rules. 16 Years later Alex Hagen won the Star Worlds again in Marblehead. This time Marcelo Ferreira (the crew of Torben Grael) was crewing.

Results

References

Star World Championships
1981 in sailing
Star World Championships in the United States